The Official Languages Ordinance is an ordinance of Hong Kong enacted for the purpose of specifying the status and use of official languages of the territory. Both Chinese and English are declared official languages with equal status in the ordinance, and are to be used in communication between the government and members of the public. It dictates that all ordinances would be enacted and published in both languages, and allows judicial officers the choice of using either language in court proceedings.

History
While no law existed prior to 1974 to designate official languages in Hong Kong, by practice, English was the sole language used in all branches of the British colonial government. Under public pressure, the Official Languages Ordinance was enacted in 1974 to declare that both English and Chinese may be used in communication between the government and the public. Despite the usage of different dialects in spoken Chinese, the government chose not to specify a dialect as an official language, instead indicating "Chinese" as an official language, allowing any dialect to be used. Since most of the local population spoke Cantonese, it became the most frequently used dialect in official communication.

References

External links

Full text of the Official Languages Ordinance

Hong Kong legislation
Language policy in Hong Kong
Language legislation